Tølløse, a railroad town, has a population of 3,759 (1 January 2022). It lies at the railroad between Roskilde and Holbæk, and the railroad from Tølløse to Slagelse operated by Lokaltog A/S.

The town is located in Region Zealand, Holbæk Municipality in Denmark and was the municipal seat of the former Tølløse Municipality until 1 January 2007.

Notable people 
 Birgitte Gøye (1511-1574) a lady in waiting, landholder, noble and County administrator of Tølløse until 1566
 Christian Detlev, Count von Reventlow (1671–1738 in Tølløse Castle) a Danish military leader and diplomat
 Peter Johansen Neergaard (1769 in Tølløsegård - 1835) a Danish landowner
 Michael Rasmussen (born 1974 in Tølløse) controversial retired Danish professional cyclist who competed in road racing and mountain biking. 
 Thomas Bruun Eriksen (born 1979 in Tølløse) a Danish professional road bicycle racer and sometime resident of Tølløse
 Belinda Jensen (born 1990 in Tølløse) contestant in Miss Earth 2012
 John Axelsen (born 1998 in Holbæk) a Danish amateur golfer, lives in Tølløse

References 

Cities and towns in Region Zealand
Holbæk Municipality